Cyclone (Maxine Hunkel) is a superheroine appearing in American comic books published by DC Comics. She is the granddaughter of the original Red Tornado, the niece of the Cyclone Kids, and a member of the Justice Society of America.

The character made her live-action debut in the DC Extended Universe film Black Adam (2022), played by Quintessa Swindell.

Publication history
Although not named as such at the time, the character who would eventually become known as Maxine Hunkel first appeared (as a new Red Tornado) in Kingdom Come #2 (June 1996) by writer Mark Waid and artist Alex Ross.

A decade later, prior to the relaunch of the Justice Society of America series, writer Geoff Johns created Maxine Hunkel, a hero who would follow the legacy of the Red Tornado. Remembering the character he designed for Kingdom Come, cover artist Alex Ross based his design for Maxine on the earlier character, retroactively making them one and the same.

Johns said:

Maxine made her debut in the DC Universe in Justice Society of America (vol. 2) #1 (February 2007).

Fictional character biography
Maxine Hunkel is the granddaughter of Abigail "Ma" Hunkel, an honorary member of the Justice Society who operated as the original Red Tornado and is currently a caretaker of the Justice Society of America's headquarters. In addition, Maxine is also the niece of the Cyclone Kids who served as Red Tornado's sidekicks. Maxine grew up idolizing her grandmother's allies in the JSA. As a 6-year-old, Maxine was once kidnapped by T.O. Morrow, the mad scientist who created the second Red Tornado, a powerful android. Morrow infects Maxine with "nanobytes" that are the apparent source of her powers. Cheerful, bubbly, and extremely intelligent (4.0 GPA and a 1300 SAT score in high school), Maxine is a 19-year-old student at Harvard University and an avid fan of the works of L. Frank Baum, particularly The Wizard of Oz, and linked works such as the musical Wicked. However, her talkative nature and know-it-all personality often alienates her peers and leave the young woman isolated. Her outcast status causes her to suffer from atypical depression. As she reached adulthood, she began to manifest unusual superhuman abilities. A sneeze demolishes her grandmother's garage and, the next day, she awoke inside a tornado five hundred feet off the ground. The young woman soon realizes that she has the power to manipulate wind. When the Justice Society decides to expand its ranks and provide training to new heroes, Maxine is one of the first on their list. She is invited to join the team by Power Girl and Mr. Terrific and accepts through extreme amounts of excitement (her motormouth response nearly causes them to revoke the offer). Shortly afterwards, she is introduced to the rest of the JSA and her fangirl personality becomes evident in her bubbling reaction to meeting her heroes, particularly fellow teen Stargirl. During the first meeting of the group, the current holder of the Mr. America mantle literally falls into their midst and perishes. As a way to help her deal, fellow member Stargirl distracts her into building a superhero outfit.

Maxine officially debuts as Cyclone in Justice Society of America (vol. 3) #3, honoring both the Red Tornado and her former sidekicks, the Cyclone Kids (Maxine's aunt and uncle Amelia "Sisty" Hunkel and Mortimer "Dinky" Jibbet). During this time, she also gains a pet monkey named "Frankie", whom she dresses up to look like one of the winged monkeys from The Wizard of Oz (she also wears a green pointed hat from time to time, causing her to resemble both the Enchantress (who wore an identical hat) and the Wicked Witch of the West). She undergoes a brief crush on teammate Damage when he is made incredibly handsome temporarily, and slowly starts learning to become less of a motormouth.

During the "Final Crisis" storyline, Maxine is seen as part of the superhero army drafted by Alan Scott to defend various Earth interests from the conquering forces of Darkseid.

After the JSA suffers a massive supervillain attack, the team divides into two. Cyclone joins the newly formed JSA All-Stars team, and soon after finds herself becoming attracted to her teammate King Chimera.

In the "Watchmen" sequel "Doomsday Clock", Cyclone returns alongside many other superheroes to the DC Universe when Doctor Manhattan, inspired by Superman, undoes the changes that he made to the timeline that erased the Justice Society of America and the Legion of Super-Heroes.

Powers and abilities
Maxine possesses the power of wind manipulation. She is able to mentally summon cyclones and whirlwinds, project powerful bursts of air, and fly through the air by riding wind currents.

Maxine has unveiled that she can control sound currents as well, gathering and sending sound waves.

Other versions

 Prior to her mainstream debut, Cyclone was featured in Kingdom Come as an ally of Superman. She originally fought Superman's Justice League after his return until she decided to side with him. Cyclone accompanies the Justice League to the Gulag to deal with the prisoner revolt. When Captain Marvel under the control of Lex Luthor arrives at the Gulag and blasts it, the prisoners are freed as they attack the Justice League.
 An alternate-reality version of Cyclone is seen in the Trinity series, as a member of the time-altered Justice Society International. She is killed in that timeline when she is sniped down while riding one of her cyclones.

In other media
Cyclone appears in the DC Extended Universe film Black Adam, portrayed by Quintessa Swindell. Like her comics counterpart, she is a member of the Justice Society.

References

Characters created by Alex Ross
Characters created by Mark Waid
Comics characters introduced in 2006
DC Comics female superheroes
DC Comics metahumans
Fictional characters with air or wind abilities